Peeltree — formerly Scoop Town, then Peel Tree — is an unincorporated community in Barbour County, West Virginia, United States.

The community takes its name from the nearby Peeltree Run.

References 

Unincorporated communities in West Virginia
Unincorporated communities in Barbour County, West Virginia